Tatyana Ustinova (November 14, 1913, Alushta — September 4, 2009, Vancouver) was a Soviet geologist, who discovered Valley of Geysers in Kamchatka.

Biography
Tatyana Ustinova graduated from Kharkiv University and subsequently worked on projects in the Ural Mountains and Reserve Ilmen. In 1940 she was transferred to the Kronotsky Nature Reserve in Kamchatka together with her husband, Yury Averin. In April 1941, while accompanied by the guide Anysyfor Pavlovich Krupenin, she found the Valley of Geysers.

Until 1946 Ustinova remained on the Kamchatka peninsula, researching the Valley of Geysers. She gave the names to the most powerful and impressive hot springs there. Later on she worked in Chişinău. In 1951, she published a book Geysers of Kamchatka.

In 1989, Ustinova left her homeland to live in Canada along with her eldest daughter, Tatyana, and she died there on September 4, 2009.

Death
Following Ustinova's testament, her ashes were buried in Valley of Geysers on August 5, 2010, 11 months and 2 days after her death.

1913 births
2009 deaths
Soviet geographers
Soviet explorers
National University of Kharkiv alumni
People from Alushta